Mattox S. Hair (born January 18, 1938) was an American politician in the state of Florida.

Hair was born in Coral Gables. He attended Florida State University, the University of Florida and Harvard Law School. He was admitted to the Florida bar in 1964. He was elected to the State Senate in 1974 and served the 9th district until 1988. He previously served in the Florida House of Representatives from  1972 to 1974.

References

External links

|-

Living people
1938 births
Democratic Party Florida state senators
Democratic Party members of the Florida House of Representatives
People from Coral Gables, Florida
People from Tavares, Florida
Florida State University alumni
University of Florida alumni
Harvard Law School alumni
20th-century American politicians
20th-century American lawyers
Florida lawyers
Candidates in the 1992 United States elections